Vikramjeet Malik (born 9 May 1983) is an Indian cricketer who plays as a medium-pace bowler for  Himachal Pradesh in domestic cricket.

Although he has been playing domestic cricket for a decade now, it was only a couple of seasons ago that he got noticed. In the 2009–10 season, he picked up 32 wickets from seven matches and finished among the top four bowlers in the Ranji Trophy.

He was part of Kings XI Punjab since IPL 2008 and was signed up by Rajasthan Royals in 2013.

References

External links 

Indian cricketers
Himachal Pradesh cricketers
Punjab Kings cricketers
North Zone cricketers
Rajasthan Royals cricketers
Living people
1983 births
Cricketers from Visakhapatnam
Royal Challengers Bangalore cricketers